Luo Tian (b.1920 - d.2001) was a People's Republic of China politician. He was born in Dananshan town, Puning, Guangdong. In 1941, he was leader of the Chinese Communist Party in Jieyang County. He was made deputy People's Congress Chairman in 1979. He was a delegate to the 6th and 7th National People's Congress.

References

1920 births
2001 deaths
People's Republic of China politicians from Guangdong
Chinese Communist Party politicians from Guangdong
Delegates to the 6th National People's Congress
Delegates to the 7th National People's Congress
Vice-governors of Guangdong